Hadrianotherae or Hadrianutherae or Hadrianoutherai was a town of ancient Mysia, on the road from Ergasteria to Miletopolis. It was built by the emperor Hadrian to commemorate a successful hunt which he had had in the neighbourhood. Coins from this town issued during the reign of Hadrian onwards are preserved. It seems to have been a place of some note; for it was the see of a bishop, and on its coins a senate is mentioned. No longer a residential see, it remains a titular see of the Roman Catholic Church.

Its site is located near Balıkesir in Asiatic Turkey.

References

Populated places in ancient Mysia
Former populated places in Turkey
Catholic titular sees in Asia
History of Balıkesir Province
Hadrian
Populated places established in the 2nd century
Roman towns and cities in Turkey